Abundio Peregrino García (born 18 August 1953) is a Mexican politician from the Labor Party. From 2006 to 2009 he served as Deputy of the LX Legislature of the Mexican Congress representing Chiapas. He previously served in the Congress of Chiapas from 2003 to 2004.

References

1953 births
Living people
Politicians from Chiapas
Labor Party (Mexico) politicians
21st-century Mexican politicians
Members of the Congress of Chiapas
People from Tonalá, Chiapas
Deputies of the LX Legislature of Mexico
Members of the Chamber of Deputies (Mexico) for Chiapas